St Monica's Church is a Roman Catholic parish church in Hoxton, Hackney, London. It was founded by the Augustinian Friars, built in 1866 and designed by E. W. Pugin. It is located on Hoxton Square. It is a Grade II listed building.

History

Construction
In August 1864, Cardinal Nicholas Wiseman invited the Order of Saint Augustine to start in a mission for the local Catholic community. 18 Hoxton Square was bought by Charles Walker for £1609 as a site for the building of a church. On 20 September 1864, the foundation stone of the church was laid by the Vicar General of the Archdiocese of Westminster, Edward Hearn. The church was designed by E. W. Pugin and built by Mr Oxborn of Clapton. In late March 1865, a concert was held in the sanctuary and part of the nave of the incomplete church. On 4 May 1865 the church was opened by the Bishop of Southwark Thomas Grant. At the opening the sermon was done by Henry Edward Manning. After its opening, the church was extended, and a priory was built next door for the Augustinians. On 4 May 1866, the feast of St Monica, the completed church was opened.

Developments
In 1875, a reredos by Franz Mayer of Munich was installed. In 1880, a lady chapel was added to the church, it was designed by John Young, the son of the architect John Young. From 1903, the Augustinian friars started going out to Hammersmith to serve the Catholic community there, eventually building St Augustine's Church in 1916. In 1907, the school next to St Monica's Church was demolished and replaced with a new one that was opened on 4 July 1908 by Archbishop of Westminster Francis Bourne.

Parish
The church has five Sunday Masses at 6.30pm on Saturday and 9am, 11am & 6.30pm on Sunday.
There are Masses 9:30am on weekdays and 11am on Saturday.

Interior

See also
 Augustinian Province of England and Scotland

References

External links
 
 

Hoxton
Churches in the Roman Catholic Diocese of Westminster
Churches in the London Borough of Hackney
Grade II listed buildings in the London Borough of Hackney
Grade II listed churches in London
Grade II listed Roman Catholic churches in England
1864 establishments in England
Roman Catholic churches completed in 1866
Gothic Revival church buildings in London
E. W. Pugin church buildings
Hoxton